The Order of the Union of Myanmar is the highest civilian decoration bestowed by the government of Myanmar (also known as Burma).

The order was founded on 2 September 1948 as a replacement for the British Order of Burma. The original order had been founded by Royal Warrant on 10 May 1940. The title Pyidaungsu Sithu Thingaha may be used by the awardee.

Award classes
The Order of the Union of Burma is awarded in two divisions (military and civil) and each of these is split into five classes:

အဂ္ဂမဟာသရေစည်သူ Agga Maha Thray Sithu - Grand Commander
သတိုးမဟာသရေစည်သူ Thado Maha Thray Sithu - Grand Officer
မဟာသရေစည်သူ Maha Thray Sithu - Commander
သရေစည်သူ Thray Sithu - Officer
စည်သူ Sithu - Member

The first class consists of a gold braided salwe worn across the breast with the badge of the order suspended. It is decorated with a large gold and enamelled breast star surrounded by five small stars.

2nd class honors have a single breast star that is smaller than the first class version.

3rd class honors have a badge, worn from a ribbon around the neck.

Recipients
Recipients of the Order include:

Agga Maha Thray Sithu

Thadoe Maha Thray Sithu

Maha Thray Sithu

Thray Sithu

Sithu

See also
Order of Burma
Thiri Thudhamma Thingaha
Salwe

References

 Mrtv3

Orders, decorations, and medals of Myanmar